Tunde Adeniji (born 17 September 1995), nicknamed The Tiger, is a Nigerian professional footballer who plays as a forward for Al-Tadamon.

Career

Rising Stars
From an early age, Tunde was scouted by officials of the Ondo State Football Agency while playing on the dusty fields of Okitipupa. He was promptly signed to the Agency's developmental side, Rising Stars Academy where he played for two seasons and helped his side to acquire promotion for the Premier League as he emerged as the top scorer of the team. He featured in 16 games and scored 7 goals.

Sunshine Stars
His exceptional performance led to his promotion to Sunshine Stars at the start of the 2013–14 season. Adeniji was expected to understudy the club's main striker, Dele Olorundare in his debut season in the top flight but he exceeded all expectations and scored thirteen (13) league goals to emerge as the club's top scorer at the end of the season.

The just concluded 2014–15 season was even better for the young striker as he became a better all round player scoring and creating chances for his teammates. Though he missed out on the golden boot award by just a goal, he ended the season with sixteen (16) goals and 7 assists with just one of his goals coming from the penalty spot.

Levski Sofia
On 17 February 2016, after long negotiations, Adeniji moved abroad to Europe to sign a 3-year contract with Bulgarian side Levski Sofia at a reported transfer fee of €180,000. His first goal for the club came in a game against Lokomotiv Plovdiv on 7 August 2016.

Atyrau
On 21 January 2018, Adeniji signed for FC Atyrau.

Al-Nasr SC
Adeniji took the trip to Kuwait and signed with Al-Nasr SC on 31 January 2019 until June 2020.

Debrecen
In July 2019, Adeniji became part of the ranks of Hungarian club Debrecen.

Kunshan F.C.
On 6 September 2020, Adeniji joined China League One side Kunshan.

Al-Fayha
On 7 February 2021, Adeniji joined Prince Mohammad bin Salman League side Al-Fayha.

Al-Adalah
On 27 July 2021, Adeniji joined Prince Mohammad bin Salman League side Al-Adalah.

Al-Tadamon
On 8 January 2023, Adeniji joined Kuwaiti club Al-Tadamon.

Career statistics

Club

International

International career
Adeniji received his first call-up for the Nigeria U20 team in 2014 and made a few appearances and scored goals. The following year he received his first call-up for the senior team.

Honours

Club
A Group Runner-up: 2015-2016

Individual
First League Player of the Month: August 2016

References

General references
 pulse.ng
 sl10.ng
 sl10.ng
 goal.com 
 news-me.com
 africanfootball.com
 sl10.ng
 informationng.com
 fcnaija.com
 thecable.ng

External links
 
 Profile in LevskiSofia.info
 

1995 births
Living people
Nigerian footballers
Nigeria international footballers
Rising Stars F.C. players
Sunshine Stars F.C. players
PFC Levski Sofia players
FC Atyrau players
Al-Nasr SC (Kuwait) players
Kunshan F.C. players
Al-Fayha FC players
Al-Adalah FC players
Nigeria Professional Football League players
First Professional Football League (Bulgaria) players
Kazakhstan Premier League players
Kuwait Premier League players
China League One players
Saudi First Division League players
Association football forwards
Expatriate footballers in Bulgaria
Expatriate footballers in Kazakhstan
Expatriate footballers in Kuwait
Expatriate footballers in China
Expatriate footballers in Saudi Arabia
Nigerian expatriate sportspeople in Bulgaria
Nigerian expatriate sportspeople in Kazakhstan
Nigerian expatriate sportspeople in Kuwait
Nigerian expatriate sportspeople in China
Nigerian expatriate sportspeople in Saudi Arabia
People from Akure
Nigeria A' international footballers
2016 African Nations Championship players